Kempstone is a village situated in the Breckland District of Norfolk and covers an area of 331 hectares (1.3 square miles) with an estimated population of 18 as of UK census 2001 At the 2011 Census the population remained less 100 and is included in the civil parish of Great Dunham.
 
The villages name means 'Cymi's farm/settlement'.

It is served by All Saints church, Litcham (with Kempston) in the Benefice of Litcham. It was once served by the now derelict St.Pauls

References

http://kepn.nottingham.ac.uk/map/place/Norfolk/Kempstone

External links

Villages in Norfolk
Breckland District
Civil parishes in Norfolk